Painted Hills is an unincorporated community and census-designated place in Jackson Township, Morgan County, in the U.S. state of Indiana. Its population was 677 as of the 2010 census. The community is located on the shores of Lake Holiday southeast of Martinsville.  Lake Holiday is 106 acres in size.

The community has 1 pub/restaurant mix and an office in the "Clubhouse".

Geography

Demographics

References

Census-designated places in Indiana
Census-designated places in Morgan County, Indiana